Deca i Sunce (Children and the Sun) is the fourth studio album by the Serbian hip-hop artist Marčelo. This is the first album released under moniker "Marčelo & Filteri". The album contains 14 songs.

Track listing

Other
Luxury Edition of the album is released on July 6, 2011. It comes with three additional tracks on main disc (and ) and bonus DVD called , recording of concert in Belgrade Youth Center.

References

2010 albums
Marčelo albums